Robert Chauncey Bishop (1882 – January 16, 1927) was an American football player and coach. He served as the head football coach at Willamette University in Salem, Oregon from 1904 to 1906.

The son of a prominent Oregon clothing maker, Bishop played college football at Columbia University in New York City

Bishop died on January 16, 1927, in Pendleton, Oregon, after having accidentally shot himself while duck hunting nearby.

References

External links
 

1882 births
1927 deaths
American football ends
Columbia Lions football players
Willamette Bearcats football coaches
People from Linn County, Oregon
Sportspeople from Salem, Oregon
Players of American football from Oregon
Firearm accident victims in the United States
Hunting accident deaths
Deaths by firearm in Oregon
Accidental deaths in Oregon